Apopterygion is a genus of triplefins in the family Tripterygiidae. It has two described species.

Species
 Apopterygion alta Kuiter, 1986 - Tasseled triplefin
 Apopterygion oculus Fricke & Roberts, 1994 - Ocellate triplefin

References

 

 
Ray-finned fish genera